In quantum field theory, penguin diagrams are a class of Feynman diagrams which are important for understanding CP violating processes in the standard model. They refer to one-loop processes in which a quark temporarily changes flavor (via a W or Z loop), and the flavor-changed quark engages in some tree interaction, typically a strong one. For the interactions where some quark flavors (e.g., very heavy ones) have much higher interaction amplitudes than others, such as CP-violating or Higgs interactions, these penguin processes may have amplitudes comparable to or even greater than those of the direct tree processes. A similar diagram can be drawn for leptonic decays.

They were first isolated and studied by Mikhail Shifman, Arkady Vainshtein, and Valentin Zakharov.

The processes which they describe were first directly observed in 1991 and 1994 by the CLEO collaboration.

Origin of the name 
John Ellis was the first to refer to a certain class of Feynman diagrams as "penguin diagrams" in a 1977 paper on b-quarks. The name came about in part due to their shape, and in part due to a legendary bar-room bet with Melissa Franklin. According to John Ellis:

See also
John Ellis

References

Electroweak theory
Diagrams